This article displays the squads for the 2013 World Women's Handball Championship, held in Serbia, the 21st edition of the event. Each team consisted of up to 18 players, of whom 16 may be fielded for each match.

Group A

Dominican Republic
Head coach: Miroslav Vujasinović

DR Congo
Head coach: Celestin Mpoua

France
Head coach: Alain Portes

Montenegro
The preliminary squad was announced on 17 November 2013.

Head coach: Dragan Adžić

Netherlands
The squad was announced on 7 November 2013.

Head coach: Henk Groener

South Korea
Head coach: Lim Young-Chul

Group B

Algeria
A preliminary squad was announced on 21 November 2013.

Head coach: Mourad Ait Ouarab

Brazil
The squad was announced on 8 November 2013.

Head coach: Morten Soubak

China
Head coach: Wang Xindong

Denmark
The squad was announced on 22 November 2013.

Head coach: Jan Pytlick

Japan
The squad was announced on 1 December 2013.

Head coach: Masamichi Kuriyama

Serbia
A preliminary squad was announced on 13 November 2013 while a 19-player list was published on 1 December 2013.

Head coach: Saša Bošković

Group C

Angola
The squad was announced on 7 December 2013.

Head coach: Vivaldo Eduardo

Argentina
The squad was announced on 22 November 2013.

Head coach: Eduardo Peruchena

Norway
The squad was announced on 14 November 2013.

Head coach: Thorir Hergeirsson

Paraguay
Head coach: Antonio Bordon

Poland
The squad was announced on 27 November 2013.

Head coach: Kim Rasmussen

Spain
The squad was announced on 15 November 2013.

Head coach: Jorge Dueñas

Group D

Australia
Head coach: Jason Hoppner

Czech Republic
The squad was announced on 5 December 2013.

Head coach: Jan Bašný

Germany
The squad was announced on 13 November 2013.

Head coach: Heine Jensen

Hungary
The squad was announced on 29 November 2013.

Head coach: János Hajdu

Romania
The final squad of 17 players was announced on 4 December 2013.

Head coach: Gheorghe Tadici

Tunisia
Head coach: Paulo de Moura

References

External links
IHF.info

World Handball Championship squads
2013 in handball